|}

The Native Upmanship Novice Chase is a Grade 3 National Hunt novice chase in Ireland which is open to horses aged five years or older. It is run at Thurles Racecourse over a distance of about 2 miles and 2 furlongs (3,621 metres), and it is scheduled to take place each year in March.

The race was first run in 2017 as the Pierce Molony Memorial Novice Chase in honour of the former manager and owner of Thurles Racecourse.

It was awarded Grade 3 status in 2020.

Records
Leading jockey : (2 Wins)
 Darragh O'Keeffe - 	I'm A Game Changer (2021), French Dynamite (2022) 

Leading trainer: (2 Wins)
 Willie Mullins -  Great Field (2017), Flame Bearer (2023)

Winners

See also
 Horse racing in Ireland
 List of Irish National Hunt races

References 

Racing Post: 

National Hunt chases
National Hunt races in Ireland
Thurles Racecourse
Recurring sporting events established in 2017